Canada national football team may refer to:

Soccer
Canada men's national soccer team, which represents Canada in association football
Canada women's national soccer team, which represents Canada in association football

Gridiron football
Canada men's national football team, which represents Canada in international gridiron football competitions.
Canada women's national American football team, which represents Canada in international gridiron football competitions

Rugby
 Canada national rugby league team, which represents Canada in rugby league football, nicknamed the Wolverines
 Canada national rugby union team, which represents Canada at rugby union football

Australian rules football
 Canada national Australian rules football team, which represents Canada at Australian rules football team

See also
 Canada national soccer team (disambiguation)
 Canada national beach soccer team
 Canada national team (disambiguation)